9 Cartoon also known as Modernine Cartoon (โมเดิร์นไนน์การ์ตูน) is a Thai cartoon programming block on air: Saturday to Sunday 7.00AM - 9.00AM (formerly on air 08.30AM - 10.30AM to August 2003, and 08.00AM - 10.00AM) in television MCOT HD. The first cartoon on air by Tiger Mask in 1981. The show's formerly as children's television was hosted by Nirun Boonyarattaphan from 1980 to 2003, and reformatted in 2015 was hosted by Pat Chonnaphantharak (Patto) and Kitiphat Pimkasemsophon until 2021.

Current Programming

Programming

References

External links
 
 mcot.net/moderninecartoon 
 modernine.mcot.net/cartoon 

Thai television shows
1980s Thai television series
1980 Thai television series debuts
MCOT HD original programming